Odair Souza (born 4 February 1982), commonly known as Nenén, is a Brazilian retired footballer who played as a midfielder.

Club career
Born in Urubici, Santa Catarina, Nenén made his senior debuts with lowly locals Guarani Palhoça. After spells at Atlético Paranaense, Figueirense, Goiás, Londrina, Criciúma, Caxias and Veranópolis, all unsuccessful, he joined Chapecoense in 2009.

On 15 July 2010 Nenén moved to Joinville in Série D, on loan until the end of the year. He returned to Chape in 2011, and after achieving promotion to Série B in 2012, made his professional debut on 31 August 2013, coming on as a second-half substitute in a 1–2 home loss against Icasa.

Nenén appeared in 14 matches during the campaign, with his side being promoted to Série A for the first time ever. He made his top level debut on 11 May 2014, again from the bench in a 1–2 home loss against Grêmio.

Nenén also established a record, being the first player to play in all Brazilian four divisions for the same club. He also renewed his link with the club in December 2014, being also the second player with most appearances for Chape in its history.

Nenén did not board LaMia Airlines Flight 2933 for the 2016 Copa Sudamericana Finals, which crashed and killed 19 of his teammates.

Career statistics

Honours
Chapecoense
Campeonato Catarinense: 2016, 2017
Copa Sudamericana: 2016

References

External links

1982 births
Living people
Sportspeople from Santa Catarina (state)
Brazilian footballers
Association football midfielders
Campeonato Brasileiro Série A players
Campeonato Brasileiro Série B players
Campeonato Brasileiro Série C players
Campeonato Brasileiro Série D players
Club Athletico Paranaense players
Figueirense FC players
Goiás Esporte Clube players
Londrina Esporte Clube players
Criciúma Esporte Clube players
Sociedade Esportiva e Recreativa Caxias do Sul players
Associação Chapecoense de Futebol players
Joinville Esporte Clube players
Concórdia Atlético Clube players